Ahvaz County is in Khuzestan province, Iran. The capital of the county is Ahvaz. At the 2006 census, the county's population was 1,317,377 in 274,296 households. The following census in 2011 counted 1,395,184 people in 351,980 households, by which time Anaqcheh Rural District and Bavi District had been separated from the county to form Bavi County. At the 2016 census, the county's population was 1,302,591 in 362,480 households, by which time Hamidiyeh District separated to form Hamidiyeh County, and Kut-e Abdollah Rural District and Soveyseh Rural District had been separated to form Karun County.

Administrative divisions

The population history and structural changes of Ahvaz County's administrative divisions over three consecutive censuses are shown in the following table. The latest census shows three districts, six rural districts, and two cities.

References

 

Counties of Khuzestan Province